Dilshad is both a given name and a surname. Notable people with the name include:

Ahmad Dilshad, Pakistani prisoner
Dilshad Akhtar, Indian singer
Dilshad Aliyarli (born 1962), Azerbaijani journalist
Dilshad Khan (born 1941), Indian singer
Dilshad Khatun (died 1351), Chobanid princess
Dilshad Meriwani (1947–1989), Kurdish poet
Dilshad Nahar Kona, Bangladeshi singer
Dilshad Najmuddin (1933–2018), Pakistani investigative official
Dilshad Said (born 1958), Kurdish musician
Dilshad Vadsaria (born c. 1985), Pakistani-born American actress
Mirza Dilshad Beg, Nepali parliamentarian
Mohomed Dilshad (born 1992), Sri Lankan cricketer